The 2022 Down Intermediate Football Championship was the 34th official edition of Down GAA's secondary Gaelic football tournament for intermediate clubs in County Down. 16 teams competed, with the winning team representing Down in the Ulster Intermediate Club Football Championship. The tournament operated a double elimination format for the opening two rounds of the championship, with the winners and early round losers rejoining at the quarter final stage.

An Riocht won the 2021 edition after defeating Darragh Cross in the final, and as per competition rules, did not defend their title as they qualified to play in the Senior Championship.

Saval won the competition for the second time, their first since 1995, after defeating Rostrevor in the final held on 15 October.

Participating teams
The following teams took part in the 2022 edition of the Down Intermediate Football Championship.

Round 1
The 16 participating teams were placed into an open draw. The winning teams advance to Round 2A, while losing sides proceed to Round 2B.

Round 2

Round 2A
Round 2A will feature the eight winning teams from Round 1, with an open draw to determine the fixtures. The winning teams progress directly to the quarter-finals, with the losing teams proceeding to Round 3.

Round 2B
Round 2B sees the eight losing teams from Round 1 compete for a place in Round 3. The losing teams from this round will be eliminated from the competition.

Relegation Semi-Finals
The 4 losers of Round 2B play each other in the Relegation Semi-Finals. The 2 winners will secure their Intermediate status for 2023, while the 2 losers will face-off in the Relegation Final.

Relegation Final
The winner of the Relegation Final will maintain their Intermediate status into 2023, while the loser will be relegated to the 2023 Down J.F.C.

 Bright relegated to 2023 Down Junior Football Championship

Round 3
Round 3 is a supplementary round for teams to have a second chance at reaching the quarter-finals. This round features teams that have lost once so far in this year's competition, either winning in Round 1 and losing in Round 2A, or losing in Round 1 but winning their Round 2B fixture. The losing teams in this round are eliminated from this year's competition.

This round is seeded, meaning that in each fixture a Round 2A losing team will face a Round 2B winning team.

Quarter-finals
The quarter-finals see the two brackets rejoin, with the earlier Round 2A winners facing a Round 3 winner for a semi-final spot.

Semi-finals
The semi-finals will see the four winning sides face off for a place in this year's final. This round is an open draw from the four quarter-final winners.

Final
The final will be played between the two semi-final winning teams, and will take place at Páirc Esler, Newry.

References

External links
 Down GAA

Down IFC